The 1943 New York Yankees season was the team's 41st season. The team finished with a record of 98–56, winning their 14th pennant, finishing 13.5 games ahead of the Washington Senators. Managed by Joe McCarthy, the Yankees played at Yankee Stadium. In the World Series, they defeated the St. Louis Cardinals in 5 games.

Offseason
 January 29, 1943: Milo Candini and Jerry Priddy were traded by the Yankees to the Washington Senators for Bill Zuber and cash.

Regular season

Season standings

Record vs. opponents

Roster

Player stats

Batting

Starters by position
Note: Pos = Position; G = Games played; AB = At bats; H = Hits; Avg. = Batting average; HR = Home runs; RBI = Runs batted in

Other batters
Note: G = Games played; AB = At bats; H = Hits; Avg. = Batting average; HR = Home runs; RBI = Runs batted in

Pitching

Starting pitchers
Note: G = Games pitched; IP = Innings pitched; W = Wins; L = Losses; ERA = Earned run average; SO = Strikeouts

Other pitchers
Note: G = Games pitched; IP = Innings pitched; W = Wins; L = Losses; ERA = Earned run average; SO = Strikeouts

Relief pitchers
Note: G = Games pitched; W = Wins; L = Losses; SV = Saves; ERA = Earned run average; SO = Strikeouts

1943 World Series 

AL New York Yankees (4) vs. NL St. Louis Cardinals (1)

Awards and records
 Spud Chandler, American League MVP (He was the oldest American League player in the 20th Century to win the MVP Award.)

Franchise records 
 Spud Chandler, Yankees single season record, Lowest earned run average in a season (1.64)

Farm system

LEAGUE CHAMPIONS: Norfolk, Wellsville

References

External links
1943 New York Yankees at Baseball Reference
1943 World Series
1943 New York Yankees team page at www.baseball-almanac.com

New York Yankees seasons
New York Yankees
New York Yankees
1940s in the Bronx
American League champion seasons
World Series champion seasons